Emerson Smith (born February 13, 1997) is an American freestyle skier. He competed in the 2018 Winter Olympics.

References

1997 births
Living people
Freestyle skiers at the 2018 Winter Olympics
American male freestyle skiers
Olympic freestyle skiers of the United States
Sportspeople from Vermont
People from Dover, Vermont